Samuel Howshall (September 1883 – after 1908) was an English footballer who played for Burslem Port Vale, Clapton Orient, Stoke, and Merthyr Town.

Career
Howshall played for Newcastle Swifts before joining Burslem Port Vale in May 1903. His first game was at outside-right in a 3–1 defeat to Preston North End at Deepdale on 3 October. After only one further Second Division appearance in the 1903–04 season he was released from the Athletic Ground at the end of the 1904–05 season. He moved on to Salisbury City before joining Clapton Orient. He returned to Staffordshire in the 1908–09 season to play one Birmingham & District League game for Stoke; he scored both goals in a 2–2 draw at Stourbridge on 14 September. After leaving the Victoria Ground he played for Merthyr Town.

Career statistics
Source:

References

1883 births
Year of death missing
Footballers from Staffordshire
English footballers
Association football outside forwards
Port Vale F.C. players
Salisbury City F.C. (1905) players
Leyton Orient F.C. players
Stoke City F.C. players
Merthyr Town F.C. players
English Football League players